JRCALC is the Joint Royal Colleges Ambulance Liaison Committee.  Their role is to provide robust clinical speciality advice to ambulance services within the UK and it publishes regularly updated clinical guidelines.  The first meeting of JRCALC was in 1989 and was hosted by the Royal College of Physicians, London.

Operations

The guidelines are supposed to be produced from evidence-based medicine. However, organisations such as the College of Paramedics have criticised the committee for poor reference to available evidence in the past.

JRCALC have produced a number of systematic reviews on various topics.  Available evidence is researched and discussed by a team of academics and clinicians including representatives from all UK ambulance services, and a number of medical disciplines.   The Guidelines are produced by the JRCALC Guideline Development Group (JRCALC-GDG) hosted by the University of Warwick.

Executive committee

 Chairman - Dr Wim Blancke
 Joint honorary secretaries - Dr Fiona Jewkes & Mr M O'Flaherty
 Honorary treasurer - Dr Fionna Moore
 Committee administrator - Carole Long

Guideline Development Group members

Dr Simon Brown - Chairman
Professor Matthew Cooke - Project Director
Dr Joanne Fisher - Senior Research Fellow
Stephen Hines - Paramedic Project Advisor
Mike Smyth - Paramedic Project Advisor

The guideline development group relies upon the unpaid work of numerous clinicians to complete the systematic reviews to support the guidelines.

Guidelines

Version 1 - 2000
Version 2 - 2004
Version 3 - April 2006
Version 4 - April 2013

References

External links
 

Medical associations based in the United Kingdom
Emergency medical services in the United Kingdom